Haplophthalmus danicus, also known as the terrestrial cave isopod or spurred ridgeback isopod, is a species of woodlouse in the family Trichoniscidae. It is naturally found in Europe, Southern Asia, and temperate Asia, however it has been introduced to North America. This species was likely introduced during original European settlement, and therefore has been well established in terrestrial communities.

Subspecies
These seven subspecies belong to the species Haplophthalmus danicus:
 Haplophthalmus danicus armenius Collinge, 1918
 Haplophthalmus danicus bagnalli Collinge, 1946
 Haplophthalmus danicus danicus Budde-Lund, 1880
 Haplophthalmus danicus rufus Arcangeli, 1960
 Haplophthalmus danicus tauricus Frankenberger, 1950
 Haplophthalmus danicus transsilvanicus Verhoeff, 1908
 Haplophthalmus danicus virescens Collinge, 1918

References

External links

 

Isopoda
Articles created by Qbugbot
Crustaceans described in 1879